Amund Helland (11 October 1846 – 15 November 1918) was a Norwegian geologist, politician and non-fiction writer. He is particularly known for his works on glacial erosion and the role of glaciers in the formation of valleys, fjords and lakes. He is also known for starting the series Norges Land og Folk, published in 20 volumes from 1885 to 1921.

Personal life
Helland was born in Bergen as the son of merchant Hans Helland (1817–1859) and Karen Marie Folkedal. He had six siblings. When his father died in 1859, his mother earned to the family's living by running a pension. He died in Kristiania in 1918.

Career
Helland was a student from 1864, and graduated as cand.min. in 1868. In his early career he made excursions to Greenland, Iceland and other European countries. In his first work, the monography Ertsforekomster i Søndhordland og Forekomster af Kise i visse Skifere i Norge from 1871, he claimed unconventional views which were not appreciated by elder colleagues. His pioneering works on glacial erosion and the role of glaciers in the formation of valleys, fjords and lakes, from the mid-1870s, have later become classics. His views on glacial erosion opposed the mainstream theories of the time, but have later been adopted in the geological sciences. He also suggested that the deposits on the North European Plain and the North Sea shelf originated from erosion of Scandinavian fjords. In 1878 he published a popular book on the structure of Earth, . From 1879 he lectured in mining operations, and he was appointed extraordinary professor in 1885. He initiated the monumental work , a book series published from 1885 until after his death. He was a member of  Nordlendingenes Forening and in 1912 he was awarded the Petter Dass Metal (Petter Dass-medaljen).

The mountain of Hellandfjellet at Prins Karls Forland, Svalbard, is named after him, as is the Helland Glacier of South Georgia.

Selected works
 (1885-1921; 20 volumes)

References

1846 births
1918 deaths
Scientists from Bergen
Quaternary geologists
Norwegian glaciologists
19th-century Norwegian geologists
20th-century Norwegian geologists